Zochawchhuah, also spelt Zochachhuah, is a village on the India-Myanmar border in Lawngtlai Block of Lawngtlai district in the state of Mizoram in India. It is located 4 km south of the District headquarters Lawngtlai, 10 km from Hmawngbuchhuah, 157 km from the State capital Aizawl. It is on the east bank of the Sekulh Lui River, which marks the India-Myanmar border.

Demographics 
 India census, the population of Zochawchhuah village is 333, with 72 Households. There are 177 males (53%) and 156 females (47%), with 168 (50% ) Scheduled Tribe and no Scheduled Cast.

Connectivity 
It is located 4 km south of the District headquarters Lawngtlai. It is located on the India-Myanmar border where National Highway 502 (India), Kaladan Multi-Modal Transit Transport Project, enters Myanmar.

India-Myanmar Border crossing
Zochawchhuah is an Indian border town with a functioning integrated immigration-and-customs India-Myanmar border check post on the Kaladan Multi-Modal Transit Transport Project.

Economy
The mainstay of the economy is agriculture.

See also 
 Hmawngbuchhuah
 Kaladan Multi-Modal Transit Transport Project
 Sittwe Port

External links 
 Kaladan Multi-Modal Transit Transport Project

References 

Cities and towns in Lawngtlai district